The Adrenalize World Tour – also known as the Adrenalize "Seven Day Weekend" Tour – was a concert tour by British hard rock band Def Leppard to support the Adrenalize album, released in March 1992. It was their first tour without guitarist Steve Clark, who died in January 1991 while the album was recorded. Former Dio and Whitesnake guitarist Vivian Campbell joined six weeks before the tour began. 

The tour kicked off with a club show in Dublin, Ireland on April 15, 1992. Campbell's first public appearance with the band, it was a warm-up for The Freddie Mercury Tribute Concert on April 20 in London.    

In 1992 and early 1993, the tour was performed in the round, with the stage surrounded by the audience; a format Leppard first used on the 1987/1988 Hysteria World Tour.

"We started the tour as a huge, long-haired, dressed-up, arena rock band," Campbell observed, "and we finished it looking like Pearl Jam: wearing ratty jeans, growing goatees and cutting our hair. During the course of that fifteen-month tour, the entire musical landscape changed."

Opening acts
GUN (Scotland)
 Ugly Kid Joe
 Thunder
 Terrorvision

Set lists

Taken from 15 April 1992 show in Dublin, Ireland
 "Stagefright"
 "Rock! Rock! (Till You Drop)"
 "Women"
 "Too Late for Love"
 "Hysteria"
 "Gods of War"
 "Die Hard the Hunter"
 "Love Bites"
 "Foolin'"
 "Rock of Ages"
 "Armageddon It"
 "Pour Some Sugar on Me"
 "Let's Get Rocked"
 "Animal"
 "Now I'm Here" (Queen cover)
 "Photograph"
 "Tear It Down"

Taken from 23 June 1992 show in Sheffield, England
 "Stagefright"
 "Tear It Down"
 "Women"
 "Too Late for Love"
 "Hysteria" (mid-song power loss)
 "Make Love Like a Man"
 Phil Collen guitar solo
 "White Lightning"
 "Foolin'"
 "Animal"
 Vivian Campbell guitar solo
 "Gods of War"
 "Rocket"
 "S.M.C."
 "Bringin' On the Heartbreak" (acoustic/electric)
 "From the Inside" (live debut: Joe Elliott acoustic)
 "Have You Ever Needed Someone So Bad"
 "Photograph"
 "Armgeddon It"
 "Pour Some Sugar on Me"
 "Let's Get Rocked"
 "Rock of Ages"

Taken from 31 December 1992 show in Phoenix, Arizona
 "Let's Get Rocked"
 "Tear It Down"
 "Women"
 "Too Late for Love"
 "Hysteria"
 "Make Love Like A Man"
 Phil Collen guitar solo
 "White Lightning"
 "Foolin'"
 "Animal"
 Vivian Campbell guitar solo
 "Gods of War"
 "Rocket"
 "Bringin' On the Heartbreak"
 "Have You Ever Needed Someone So Bad"
 "Armageddon It"
 "Rock of Ages"
 "Pour Some Sugar on Me"
 "Love Bites"
 "Photograph"

Tour dates

Touring personnel

Band:
 Joe Elliott – Lead vocals, rhythm & acoustic guitar, keyboards
 Phil Collen – Lead & rhythm guitars, backing vocals
 Vivian Campbell – Lead & rhythm guitars, backing vocals
 Rick Savage  – Bass, keyboards, rhythm & acoustic guitars, backing vocals
 Rick Allen – drums, backing vocals

Management:
 Malvin Mortimer – Tour manager
 Mark Spring – Production manager 
 Dick Adams – Tour accountant
 Gary Perkins – Stage manager
 Jonathan Smeeton – Lighting/set designer
 Butch Allen – Lighting director
 Robert Scovill – Sound engineer
 Phil Wilkey – Monitor engineer

Crew:
 Peter Lothian – Vari*Lite programmer/operator 
 Barry Branford – Intellabeam technician
 David Sutherland – Bass technician
 Tony Moon – Drum technician
 Stan Schiller – Guitar technician
 Liam Col – Guitar technician
 Mick Panasci – Vari*Lite technician
 Stewart Felix – Vari*Lite technician
 J.R. "Weasel" Engington – Dimmer technician
 Joe "Keebler" Campbell – Tracking technician
 Ted Leamy – Head Sound technician
 Larry Vodopivek – Sound technician
 David Stogner – Sound technician
 Mark Tooch – Sound technician
 Charlie Passarelli – Head laser technician
 Harald Kohl – Laser technician
 Gordon Hum – Laser technician

References

Def Leppard concert tours
1992 concert tours
1993 concert tours